Kamel Al Rimali (born 1922) was an Egyptian classical composer. His opera in Arabic Hasan Al-Basri (Arabic: الحسن البصري) is based on the life of Hasan of Basra.

References

1922 births
2011 deaths
Egyptian composers